Sphenomorphus alfredi  is a species of skink, a lizard in the family Scincidae. The species is endemic to Malaysia near Mount Kinabalu, Sabah, and Borneo.

Etymology
The specific name, alfredi, is in honour of British naturalist Alfred Hart Everett.

Habitat
The preferred natural habitat of S. alfredi is forest, generally in low hills.

Reproduction
The mode of reproduction of S. alfredi is unknown.

References

Further reading
Boulenger GA (1898). "Third Report on Additions to the Lizard Collection in the Natural-History Museum". Proceedings of the Zoological Society of London 1898: 912–923. (Lygosoma alfredi, new species, p. 922 + Plate LV, figure 4).
Mittleman MB (1952). "A Generic Synopsis of the Lizards of the Subfamily Lygosominae". Smithsonian Miscellaneous Collections 117 (17): 1–35. (Sphenomorphus alfredi, new combination, p. 21).

alfredi
Reptiles described in 1898
Taxa named by George Albert Boulenger
Reptiles of Borneo